Bornman or Bornmann is a surname. Notable people with the surname include:

Corné Bornman (born 1942), South African sports shooter
Erik Bornmann (born 1976), Canadian consultant
Jannie Bornman (born 1980), South African professional rugby union player

See also
Borman